The 1964 United States presidential election in Georgia took place on November 3, 1964, as part of the 1964 United States presidential election, which was held on that day throughout all 50 states and The District of Columbia. Voters chose 12 representatives, or electors to the Electoral College, who voted for president and vice president.

This would mark the first time ever that Georgia was carried by the Republican nominee in a presidential election, breaking a Democratic consecutive voting streak of 92 years, after the Civil War, beginning in 1868. It is also the only time that a Democrat won more than 380 electoral votes with none of them coming from Georgia.

Background
During the 1960s, the Deep South was in a state of turmoil due to upheavals resulting from the civil rights movement. The Democratic Party had traditionally been the defender of white supremacy and segregation in the South, but ever since acquiring the support of northern blacks in the 1930s, wartime race riots in Detroit, and the ascendancy of Henry A. Wallace to the vice presidency its left wing had become strong supporters of moves to restore black political rights in the former Confederacy. The growth of protests and marches demanding black civil rights in the region early in the 1960s led the reluctant John F. Kennedy to submit "sweeping Civil Rights legislation to Congress". Following Kennedy's assassination, new President Lyndon Johnson, although a Southerner, pushed decisively for civil rights legislation, which produced the Civil Rights Act of July 1964.

The independence of county governance from the state legislature, and the very large number of counties in the state, produced a split in policy between areas in and north of Atlanta versus the south of the state. In the south of Georgia, local officials behaved similarly to those of Mississippi and organised large-scale, violent "massive resistance" to desegregation and voter registration by blacks. Although Governor Carl Sanders endorsed Johnson, and was bitterly critical of Republican nominee, Arizona Senator Barry Goldwater's belief that "extremism in the defense of liberty is no vice", he was alone among Georgia's leading officials in doing so. Most state politicians, led by James H. Gray, firmly preferred Goldwater because of his vote against the Civil Rights Act, as did Calvin F. Craig, who headed Georgia's powerful Ku Klux Klan, because he saw the election as battle between Goldwater's "Americanism" and Johnson's "socialism". A "Democrats for Goldwater" group was also organized by the "Citizens' Council".

Polls
The majority of opinion polls between July and early October suggested that, despite this widespread opposition to Johnson's programs, Goldwater would not take the Peach State. In fact, in early August, Georgia was viewed as alongside Arkansas and North Carolina as the most secure southern state for Johnson.

Nevertheless, those Democratic Party delegates who refused to support Goldwater because of his policies on rural electrification and subsidies to tobacco farmers were concerned that Goldwater could carry Georgia – and the entire South – as early as late August.

Moreover, in Valdosta in the far south, the region where resistance to black civil rights was most extreme, white union workers in September had been polled as supporting Goldwater 315 to 19, with 1 vote for George Wallace who would carry the state in 1968. By the end of September, it was clear that the state was bitterly divided, with the previously rock-solid Democratic south rooting for Goldwater but defections from Republican support during the previous election in the northern counties appearing to be almost as widespread, because there was some hope Johnson could reverse large population declines and entrenched poverty.

By the end of October, amidst much campaigning in the state by both Johnson and Goldwater, it was generally thought Georgia was leaning towards the Republicans.

Vote
As it turned out Georgia joined Mississippi, Alabama, South Carolina and Louisiana in supporting the Arizona senator as a protest against the Civil Rights Act, although it did so by a smaller margin – 8.25% – than any other Deep South state Goldwater carried. Over-representation of urban areas in polling was blamed for this discrepancy.

Compared to the previous election, Georgia swung to the Republicans by over 34%, though this masked enormous regional differences. Among the rural areas of the "black belt" and the south of the state, there were enormous swings to Goldwater as the whites – the only people who voted – totally deserted Johnson. For instance, Miller County went from 94% for Kennedy to only 14% for Johnson, and Lee County from 69% for Kennedy to only 19 percent for Johnson.

In contrast, only 55% of those Georgian voters who supported Nixon in 1960 remained with Goldwater. Deserting of the Republicans in pro-Union and almost entirely white Appalachia gave Towns County to the Democrats for the first time since 1952, and nearly switched Gilmer and Pickens Counties. Illustrating the "bifurcated" political change in the state was that while FDR carried the state by 83.83 percentage points in 1932, Herbert Hoover had won Towns County by 48 votes. One of the best examples of Pro-Unionists going to Democrats was Long County, which had only given Kennedy 23 percent of the vote in 1960, but gave Johnson 84% in 1964.

Goldwater's victory in Georgia in 1964 was the Republican Party's first ever victory in the state in any presidential election. This was an incredible feat, especially given that Goldwater lost to Lyndon B. Johnson in a landslide. The Peach State had long been a Democratic stronghold, which it would remain, Presidential elections aside, well into the 1990s. Between 1852 and 1960, Georgia had supported the Democratic Presidential nominee in every election with the sole exception of 1864, when Georgia had seceded from the Union. However, from this election onward, the Peach State has supported Democrats only four times, and two of those occurred when Georgia native Jimmy Carter was on the ballot while fellow southern Democrat Bill Clinton would do so the third time, in 1992, and then Joe Biden would do so narrowly in 2020.

During the concurrent House elections of 1964 in Georgia, Republicans picked up a seat from the Democrats, that being the Third District House seat won by Howard Callaway who became the first Republican to be elected to the House of Representatives from Georgia since Reconstruction.

With 54.12% of the popular vote, Georgia would prove to be Goldwater's fifth strongest state in the 1964 election after Mississippi, Alabama, South Carolina and Louisiana.

Georgia was 1 of the 3 states that voted with a certain party for the first time in this election, the other two being Alaska and Vermont, both of which voted for a Democratic presidential candidate for the first time.

Results

Results by county

References

1964 Georgia (U.S. state) elections
Georgia
1964